Graham Smith (born 21 June 1975 in St Albans) is a British rower.

External links 
 
 

1975 births
Living people
English male rowers
British male rowers
Sportspeople from St Albans
Olympic rowers of Great Britain
Rowers at the 1996 Summer Olympics
World Rowing Championships medalists for Great Britain